Jean-Luc Vandenbroucke (born 31 May 1955 in Mouscron) is a Belgian former road bicycle racer, track cyclist and directeur sportif. He is an uncle of Frank Vandenbroucke. He was a prologue specialist, winning 19 prologues throughout his career.

Cycling career
He won the one-day classic Blois-Chaville (a reconfigured version of Paris-Tours) in 1982. However, certain victory in the race was snatched from Laurent Fignon, who broke a pedal crank while in the lead near the finish.

External links

1955 births
Living people
People from Mouscron
Belgian male cyclists
Belgian Vuelta a España stage winners
Cyclists from Hainaut (province)